United States Coast Guard Station Chatham is a United States Coast Guard station located in Chatham, Massachusetts. The station was the site of the famous 1952 Pendleton rescue.

See also
List of military installations in Massachusetts

External links
USCG Sector Southeastern New England

Chatham, Massachusetts
United States Coast Guard stations
Military installations in Massachusetts
Buildings and structures in Barnstable County, Massachusetts